Sandra Paola Luzardo León (born 18 July 1999) is a Venezuelan footballer who plays as a centre back for Spanish Segunda División Pro club Alhama CF and the Venezuela women's national team.

International career
Luzardo represented Venezuela at the 2014 Summer Youth Olympics and two FIFA U-17 Women's World Cup editions (2014 and 2016). At senior level, she made her debut on 22 November 2014 in a 3–0 friendly victory against Nicaragua.

References

1999 births
Living people
Women's association football central defenders
Venezuelan women's footballers
Fundación Albacete players
Venezuela women's international footballers
Competitors at the 2014 Central American and Caribbean Games
Olympic silver medalists for Venezuela
Footballers at the 2014 Summer Youth Olympics
Primera División (women) players
Venezuelan expatriate women's footballers
Venezuelan expatriate sportspeople in Spain
Expatriate women's footballers in Spain
People from Mérida, Mérida
21st-century Venezuelan women